The Royal Television Society Programme Awards, (often referred to as the RTS Awards) seek to recognise programmes or individuals who have made a positive and material contribution to their genre: either because their content or originality in form has in some way moved the genre forward, or perhaps even created a new genre; or because their quality has set standards which other programme-makers can emulate and learn from.

In addition to the national awards and the craft & design awards, the Royal Television Society also hosts a number of regional award ceremonies throughout the UK and Ireland.

Award Categories 
The original Royal Television Society Programme Awards can be traced back to 1975 when there were just seven categories. In 1989 the categories were revised and awards in these new categories conferred for the award year of 1988. It was also in this year that nominations for some categories were introduced for the very first time. Since 2016 the awards have been primarily focussed on home-grown output, with Fargo, the final winner of the International category in 2015. In 2023 the number of award categories stood at 30.

Controversies 
In February 2017 broadcaster Piers Morgan pulled out as host after only three days, citing a public campaign branding him as damaging and inappropriate for the event.

Judging 
The RTS Programme Awards winners are selected not by public vote but decided via judging panels composed of industry experts and professionals. In 2016 the make up of the judging panels was adjusted to include more women and people from minority backgrounds. From approximately 200 jurors, 52% were now female and 27% from BAME backgrounds. The move towards more diversity came in the wake of the #OscarsSoWhite campaign. At the time of the 2020 awards, the overall jury composition was 56% female and 32% came from BAME backgrounds.

Winners: 1998–present 
2023 winners

This year saw the introduction of two new performance categories: supporting actor male and supporting actor female.

2022 winners

This year saw the return to a live audience event after the lifting of COVID-19 restrictions. Comedian Graham Norton was presented the outstanding achievement award for 2020 which he had been unable to collect at that time due to having COVID-19. 

2021 winners

For the second year running, due to COVID-19 related restrictions the 2021 winners ceremony was held behind closed doors and without a live audience. In 2021 a new award category for comedy entertainment programme was established. A special award was bestowed on John McVay, Sara Geater, Max Rumney, Hakan Kousetta and their team at PACT (Producers Alliance for Cinema and Television) in this year to recognise the difficulties and challenges for the independent production sector during the pandemic year.

2020 winners

Due to COVID-19 related restrictions the 2020 winners ceremony was held behind closed doors and without a live audience. The outstanding achievement award was not awarded as comedian Graham Norton had COVID-19, (it would be retroactively awarded in 2022 once the ceremony returned as a live audience event).

2019 winners

In 2019 the comedy performance award was split into two (male and female) for the first time.

2018 winners

In 2018 Netflix's historical drama The Crown was bestowed a special recognition award.

2017 winners

This year saw the drama serial award retired to make way for two new awards: the mini-series award and the RTS channel of the year award.

2016 winners

In 2016 a single breakthrough award was revived to replace the two awards (behind the scenes and on-screen) that were last bestowed in 2008. The children's fiction award was retired as was the international award.

2015 winners

2014 winners

In 2014 the nations & regions programme award was dropped to make room for two sports-related awards; sports programme and sports presenter, commentator or pundit.

2013 winners

In 2013 the award for live event was revived having been lasted bestowed in 2004. This year was also notable for the RTS television awards in that two judges' awards were bestowed for the very first time. 

2012 winners

2011 winners

2011 saw a reversal of the 2009 decision with two documentary categories reinstated and the constructed factual series award removed along with the multi-channel programme award.

2010 winners

2009 winners

In 2009 the two separate awards for documentaries were merged to make room for an award for constructed factual series, created to recognise the growth and popularity of the reality tv series genre.

2008 winners

In 2008 the RTS Gold Medal was superseded by the lifetime achievement award. The two breakthrough awards (behind the scenes and on-screen) were retired in this year as was the award for nations & regions presenter.

2007 winners

2006 winners (Programme Awards 2005)

In 2006 the two newcomer awards (behind the scenes and on-screen) were each renamed as the breakthrough awards. No RTS Gold Medal recipient is recorded for this year.

2005 winners (Programme Awards 2004)

In 2005 the event award was once again dropped to make way for a new digital channel programme award and the writing award was split into two awards; writer: comedy, and writer: drama. No RTS Gold Medal recipient is recorded for this year.

2004 winners (Programme Awards 2003)

In 2004 the acquired award introduced the previous year was redesignated as the international award and the serials & single drama award was once again split back into two separate awards, namely the drama serial award and the single drama award. No RTS Gold Medal recipient is recorded for this year.

2003 winners (Programme Awards 2002)

2003 saw two completely new categories introduced in the shape of the acquired programme award and the comedy performance award. An event award was also reintroduced, similar to the live event award that had been last bestowed in 1998. The team award was retired in this year. 

2002 winners (Programme Awards 2001)

In 2002 three new awards were introduced; the soap and continuing drama award; the science & natural history award; and the history award. Other changes saw the children's drama and the children's entertainment categories merged to become the children's fictional award; and the drama serial award merged with the single drama award. Awards for documentary strand and regional documentary were retired.

2001 winners (Programme Awards 2000)

No RTS Gold Medal recipient is recorded for this year.
{| class="wikitable" 
|+Presented: 20 March 2001
! width="20%" | Award
! width="40%" | Winners
! width="40%" | Nominees
|-
|Judges' Award
|John Willis (MD: LWT & United Productions)
|–
|-
|Actor: Female
| Katy Murphy as Lucy Pannick in Donovan Quick (BBC Scotland) 
|
 Lesley Manville as Nadine in Other People's Children (BBC One)
 Sophie Okonedo as Jo Weller in Never Never (Channel 4)
|-
|Actor: Male
|Steven Mackintosh as Davey Younger in Care (BBC One) 
|
 Alun Armstrong as George Oldfield on This Is Personal: The Hunt for the Yorkshire Ripper (ITV)
 Phil Davis as Peter McLeish in North Square (Channel 4)
|-
|Arts
| Arena: "Wisconsin Death Trip" (BBC Two)
| 
 Howard Goodall's Big Bangs (Channel 4)
|-
|Children's Drama
|My Parents Are Aliens (CITV)
|
 Microsoap (CBBC)
|-
|Children's Entertainment
|SMTV Live (ITV)
|
 Grizzly Tales for Gruesome Kids (ITV)
 The Rottentrolls (CITV)
|-
|Children's Factual
|Blue Peter (BBC One)
|
 Short Change (CBBC) 
 The Investigators (Channel 4)
|-
|Documentary Series
|15 (Channel 4)
|
 Love is Not Enough (BBC One) 
 The Day the World Took Off (Channel 4)
|-
|Documentary Strand
|Correspondent (BBC Two)
|
 Horizon (BBC Two)
 Real Life (ITV)
|-
|Drama Serial
|Nature Boy (BBC Two)
|
 Never Never (Channel 4)
 This Is Personal: The Hunt for the Yorkshire Ripper (ITV)
|-
|Drama Series
|Clocking Off (BBC One)
|
 At Home with the Braithwaites (ITV) 
 Hearts and Bones (BBC One)
|-
|Entertainment
|Da Ali G Show (Channel 4)
|
 The Frank Skinner Show (ITV)
 Trigger Happy TV (Channel 4) 
|-
|Features Daytime
|Watercolour Challenge (Channel 4)
|
 A Place in the Sun (Channel 4) 
 Live Talk (ITV)
|-
|Features Primetime
|Big Brother (Channel 4)
|
 Scrapheap Challenge (Channel 4)
 The Naked Chef (BBC Two)
|-
|Newcomer – Behind the Scenes
|Liza Marshall – The Sins (BBC One)
|–
|-
|Newcomer – On Screen
| Rob Brydon in Marion and Geoff (BBC Two)
|
 Dom Joly in Trigger Happy TV (Channel 4) 
 James Corden as Jamie Rymer in Fat Friends (ITV) 
|-
|Presenter
|Graham Norton – So Graham Norton (Channel 4)
|
 Chris Tarrant – Who Wants to Be a Millionaire? (ITV)
 Davina McCall – Big Brother (Channel 4)
|-
|Regional Documentary
| Spotlight: "Capitol Hill" (BBC Northern Ireland)
|
 Ex-S: "The Drowned Village" (BBC Scotland) 
 Showing Off (BBC East)
|-
|Regional Presenter
|Stephen Jardine (STV)
|
 Alastair Stewart – Who Wants To Be A London Mayor? (Carlton) 
 Donna Traynor (BBC Northern Ireland) 
|-
|Regional Programme
| New Found Land: "I Saw You" (STV / Grampian)
|
 Chewin' the Fat (BBC Scotland) 
 Just Desserts (HTV) 
|-
|Single Documentary
|True Stories: "100% White" (Channel 4)
|
 News from Number 10 (BBC Two) 
 The Man Who Bought Mustique (Channel 4) 
|-
|Single Drama
|Storm Damage (BBC Two)
|
 Care (BBC One) 
 Donovan Quick (BBC Scotland) 
|-
|Situation Comedy and Comedy Drama
|The Royle Family (BBC Two)
|
 Cold Feet (ITV) 
 One Foot in the Grave (BBC One) 
|-
|Team
|Big Brother (Channel 4)
|
 Castaway 2000 (BBC One)
 Children in Need: "21st Birthday Edition" (BBC One)
|-
|Television Performance
|Julia Davis – Human Remains (BBC Two)
|
 Dom Joly – Trigger Happy TV (Channel 4) 
 Rob Brydon – Marion and Geoff (BBC Two)
|-
|Writing
|Paul Abbott for Clocking Off (BBC One)
|
 Kieran Prendiville for Care (BBC One) 
 Tony Marchant for Never Never (Channel 4)
|}
2000 winners (Programme Awards 1999)

1999 winners (Programme Awards 1998)

This year saw a special recognition award for the Channel 4 comedy series Father Ted to mark Dermot Morgan's passing in February 1998. The features award was split into two categories: Daytime and Primetime, and the live event award was discontinued.

1998 winners (Programme Awards 1997)

In 1998 the following new awards were instituted: Documentary strand; Features; Newcomer – behind the scenes; and Newcomer – on screen.

 Winners: 1989–1997 

In 1989 the awards categories underwent a major revision and several new categories were created. These new awards were retrospectively conferred for the award year of 1988. It was also in 1989 that nominations were introduced in certain categories for the very first time.

Single Drama
1988: Tumbledown1989: Nobody Here but us Chickens (Channel 4)
1990: Shoot to Kill1991: Prime Suspect1992: Hedd Wyn1993: The Snapper1994: Screen Two – Criminal1995: 11 Men Against 11 (Channel Four)
1996: HillsboroughDrama Series
1988: Blind Justice (BBC)
1989: A Bit of a Do1990: Inspector Morse1991: Casualty1992: Between the Lines: "Out of the Game"
1993: Cracker1994: Common As Muck1995: All Quiet on the Preston Front1996: BallykissangelDrama Serial
1988: A Very British Coup1989: Nice Work1990: Oranges Are Not The Only Fruit1991: Children of the North1992: Goodbye Cruel World1993: Tales of the City1994: Common as Muck1995: Hearts and Minds1996: Our Friends in the NorthSingle Documentary
1988: Afghantsi1989: Four Hours in My Lai1990: Red Hot (Central TV)
1991: The Leader, His Driver and the Driver's Wife1992: Katie and Eilish: Siamese Twins (Yorkshire TV)
1993: Disappearing World: "We Are All Neighbours"
1994: 25 Bloody Years: "The Dead" (BBC)
1995: True Stories: The Betrayed (Channel Four)
1996: True Stories: Crime of the Wolf (Channel Four)

Documentary Series
1988: Armada (BBC South and East)
1989: Around the World in 80 Days with Michael Palin1990: Hello Do You Hear Us? (Channel 4)
1991: Secret History
1992: Pandora's Box: "The League of Gentleman"
1993: The Plague (Channel 4)
1994: Network First1995: The Factory (Channel Four)
1996: The System (BBC)

Situation Comedy (Situation Comedy & Comedy Drama from 1994)
1988: The Comic Strip Presents... "The Strike"
1989: Blackadder Goes Forth1990: Rab C. Nesbitt1991: One Foot in the Grave: "The Man in the Long Black Coat"
1992: One Foot in the Grave: "The Worst Horror of All"
1993: One Foot in the Grave1994: Drop the Dead Donkey1995: Men Behaving Badly1996: Only Fools and HorsesEntertainment
1988: Alexei Sayle's Stuff1989: Whose Line Is It Anyway?1990: French and Saunders1991: Vic Reeves Big Night Out1992: Victoria Wood's All Day Breakfast1993: Barrymore1994: Don't Forget Your Toothbrush (Channel Four)
1995: Shooting Stars1996: The Fast ShowArts
1988: Omnibus: "Whale Nation"
1989: Arena: "Tales from Barcelona"
1990: Bookmark: "From Moscow to Pietushki"
1991: Bookmark: "Dostoevsky's Travels"
1992: Bookmark: "Miss Pym's Day Out"
1993: The Wonderful Horrible Life of Leni Riefenstahl
1994: Shakespeare on the Estate (BBC)
1995: The Homecoming (BBC)
1996: Arena: "The Burger and the King"

Outside Broadcast (Live Event from 1993)
1988: Scrumdown (Yorkshire TV)
1989: Lord Olivier Memorial Service (BBC)
1990: 90 Glorious Years (BBC)
1991: As it Happens – Moscow New Year (Channel 4)
1992: Last Night of the Proms
1993: Stiffelio (BBC)
1994: D-Day Remembered (BBC)
1995: VJ50: The Final Tribute (BBC)
1996: Christmas with the Royal Navy (West Country TV)

Regional Programme
1988: The Calendar Fashion Show (Yorkshire TV)
1989: Charlie Wing (Television South)
1990: First Sight: "Baby Alex" (BBC South and East)
1991: Scotch and Wry (BBC Scotland)
1992: The Snow Show (BBC Scotland)
1993: Selected Exits (BBC Wales)
1994: The Empire Laughs Back (BBC Northern Ireland)
1995: Two Ceasefires and a Wedding (BBC Northern Ireland)
1996: Tartan Shorts – The Star (BBC Scotland)

Performance Award: male (Male Actor Award from 1994)
1988: Colin Firth (Tumbledown)
1989: Alfred Molina (Screen Two: "Virtuoso" / Screen One: "The Accountant")
1990: Ian Richardson (House of Cards)
1991: Robert Lindsay (G.B.H.)
1992: David Jason
1993: Robbie Coltrane
1994: Tom Wilkinson
1995: Robert Carlyle
1996: David Jason

Performance Award: female (Female Actor Award from 1994)
1988: Maggie Smith (Talking Heads)
1989: Janet McTeer (Precious Bane)
1990: Charlotte Coleman (Oranges Are Not the Only Fruit)
1991: Helen Mirren (Prime Suspect)
1992: Julia Sawalha
1993: Kathy Burke
1994: Jane Horrocks
1995: Helen McCrory
1996: Stella Gonet

Children's Award: Drama & Light Entertainment (Drama from 1992)
1989: Maid Marian and Her Merry Men1990: Press Gang1991: Dodgem (BBC)
1992: The Borrowers1993: Just Us (Yorkshire TV)
1994: Children's Ward1995: The Queen's Nose1996: Retrace (ITV)

Children's Award: Factual
1989: The Lowdown: "Brave Heart"
1990: The Lowdown: "Today I am a Man"
1991: Mozart is Alive and Well in Milton Keynes (BBC)
1992: Newsround Special "SOS; The Suffering of Somalia"
1993: It'll Never Work?1994: As Seen on TV: "Sheffield" (BBC)
1995: Short Change1996: Wise UpChildren's Award: Entertainment
1992: What's The Noise! (BBC)
1993: Old Bear Stories1994: ZZZap!1995: Wolves, Witches and Giants1996: The Ant & Dec Show (BBC)

Technique
1988: Stephen Seddon – How to Be Cool (Granada)
1989: Brendan Shore – Theatre Night: "Metamorphosis"
1990: Mike Blakely – Disappearing World: "The Kalasha: Rites of Spring"
1991: Stephen Seddon – How to Be Cool (Granada)
1992: Lee Eynon – Barcelona Olympics British Medals Sequence (BBC)
1993–1995: No awards made

Writer's Award
1990: Ben Elton
1991: Lynda La Plante
1992: Andy Hamilton and Guy Jenkin (Drop the Dead Donkey)
1993: Roddy Doyle (The Snapper)
1994: Donna Franceschild (Takin' Over the Asylum)
1995: Jimmy McGovern and Paul Powell (Love Bites - Go Now)
1996: Peter Flannery

Regional Documentary
1991: Summer on the Estate: Episode 1 (LWT)
1992: The Tuesday Special: "Caution – Our Hands Are Tied"
1993: This Mine is Ours (STV)
1994: O Flaen Dy Lygaid / Y Ffordd Galeta (S4C)
1995: Being There: "Last Post on the River Kwai" (Granada)
1996: Home Truths: "A Woman in Twelve" (BBC Northern Ireland)

Team Award
1992: The Big Breakfast1993: This Morning1994: Desmond's1995: EastEnders1996: Gulliver's TravelsPresenter
1993: Male – Chris Evans (The Big Breakfast)
1993: Female – Margi Clarke (The Good Sex Guide)
1994: Jon Snow
1995: John Tusa
1996: Cilla Black

Regional Presenter
1993: Eddie Ladd – The Slate (BBC Wales)
1994: Jane Franchi (BBC Scotland)
1995: Paddy Kielty (BBC Northern Ireland)
1996: Kaye Adams

Television Performance (Entertainment Performance from 2001)
1994: Rory Bremner
1995: Caroline Hook
1996: Paul Whitehouse

RTS Gold Medal
1989: Owen Edwards
1990: David Attenborough
1991: Paul Fox
1992: Charles Wheeler
1993: Dennis Potter
1994: Coronation Street and Cilla Black
1995: Bill Cotton
1996: Michael Grade

Network Newcomer
1996: Francesca Joseph

Cyril Bennett Award (merged with Judges' Award in 1994)
1989: Roger Bolton
1990: Bill Ward
1991: Liz Forgan
1992: Charles Wheeler
1993: Betty Willingale

Judges' Award
1988: John Lloyd
1989: George Jesse Turner
1990: Alan Clarke
1991: David Croft
1992: Lewis Rudd and Anna Home
1993: Brian Large
1994: Ted Childs
1995: Alan Yentob
1996: Tony Garnett

 Winners: 1975–1988 

Original Programme Award
1975: The Burke Special: "The Brian" (BBC)
1976: On the Move (BBC)
1977: Rock Follies (Thames TV)
1978: Horizon 2002 (BBC)
1979: The Kenny Everett Video Show (Thames TV)
1980: Circuit Eleven Miami (BBC Two)
1981: The Hitchhiker's Guide to the Galaxy (BBC)
1982: Whoops Apocalypse (LWT)
1983: Jane (BBC)
1984: The Skin Horse (Central TV)
1985: 28 Up (Michael Apted)
1986: The Max Headroom Show1987: Phil Cool (BBC)
1988: V (Channel 4)

Performance Award
1975: Gordon Jackson (Upstairs, Downstairs)
1976: Tom Conti (The Glittering Prizes)
1977: Siân Phillips (I, Claudius)
1978: Peter Barkworth (Professional Foul / Secret Army / The Country Party)
1979: Ian Holm (The Lost Boys)
1980: Timothy West (Churchill and the Generals)
1981: Celia Johnson and Michael Hordern (All's Well that Ends Well)
1982: Ian Richardson (Private Schulz)
1983: Ian McKellan (Walter)
1984: Alan Bates (An Englishman Abroad)
1985: Jean Alexander (Coronation Street)
1986: Anna Massey (Hotel du Lac / Sacred hearts) and David Suchet (Blott on the Landscape / A Song for Europe / Freud)
1987: Joan Hickson (Miss Marple) and Michael Gambon (The Singing Detective)
1988: Miranda Richardson (Sweet As You Are) and Ray McAnally (The Perfect Spy)

Regional Programme Award
1975: Oh to be in Ulster (BBC Northern Ireland)
1976: A Man Between Three Rivers (Anglia TV)
1977: It's No Joke Living in Barnsley (Yorkshire TV)
1978: Beneath the Pennines: Pippikin Pot (BBC North)
1979: From the Roots came the Wrapper (BBC North West)
1980: Lancaster Legend – A Pilot's Story (BBC North)
1981: Valentine's Day (Tyne Tees TV)
1982: Recipe for Disaster (Television South West)
1983: Cavalcade: A Backstage Story (BBC South)
1984: I Can Hear you Smile (STV)
1985: The Dying Swan (BBC East)
1986: Living with CF (BBC Midlands)
1987: All Change at Evercreech Junction (BBC West)
1988: Paper Kisses (BBC Leeds)

Writer's Award
1975: Stan Barstow (South Riding / A Raging Calm / Joby)
1976: Ron Downing (A Man Between Three Rivers)
1977: Jack Rosenthal
1978: Tom Stoppard (Professional Foul)
1979: Andrew Birkin (The Lost Boys)
1980: Elaine Morgan (Testament of Youth)
1981: Peter Ransley (Minor Complications)
1982: Jack Pulman (Private Schulz)
1983: Alan Bleasdale (Boys from the Blackstuff)
1984: Alan Bennett (An Englishman Abroad) and Ken Taylor (The Jewel in the Crown)
1985: Alan Plater (On Your Way, Riley / The Beiderbecke Affair)
1986: Alan Bennett (The Insurance Man) and Graham Reid (Ties of Blood)
1987: Andrew Davies (A Very Peculiar Practice)
1988: Bill Nicholson (Life Story / Sweet As You Are)

Technique Award
1975: Jimmy Boyers (Anthony and Cleopatra)
1976: David Multon (BBC)
1977: Vic Finch (LWT)
1978: Philip Bonham-Carter (Americans / The Long Search)
1979: BBC (The Light Princess)
1980: Thames TV (Quincy's Quest)
1981: STV (Eternal Spiral)
1982: Dave Jervis, Bert Postlethwaite, Dick Coles, Norman Brierley and Peter Ware (Gulliver in Lilliput)
1983: LWT (Outside Edge)
1984: Bill Millar (The Hot Shoe Show)
1985: Robin Lobb / BBC Special Effects team (The Box of Delights)
1986: Roger Pratt (Dutch Girls – LWT)
1987: John Fyfe and Colin Innes-Hopkins (Fire and Ice – LWT)
1988: John Hooper (Cariani and the Courtesans – BBC)

Design Award
1975: Fred Pusey
1976: David Myerscough-Jones (The Flying Dutchman – BBC)
1977: Thames TV (Rock Follies)
1978: Roy Stonehouse (Hard Times)
1979: Barry Newbery (The Lost Boys)
1980: Sally Hulke (Testament of Youth)
1981: Andrew Drummond (Blade on a Feather)
1982: Tim Harvey (The Borgias)
1983: Juanita Waterson (The Barchester Chronicles)
1984: Vic Symonds / Alan Pickford (The Jewel in the Crown)
1985: Jan Spoczynski (A Month in the Country / Much Ado About Nothing)
1986: The Design Team (The Max Headroom Show)
1987: The Design Team (The Singing Detective)
1988: the design award was spun off into the Craft & Design Awards

Outstanding Achievement – Behind the camera
1975: Diana Edwards-Jones
1976: John Willis
1977: Production team of Sailor1978: John Irvin
1979: Christopher Ralling
1980: Jonathan Powell
1981: Jonathan Miller
1982: Innes Lloyd
1983: Ronald Neil
1984: Margaret Matheson
1985: Richard Taylor
1986: Edward Barnes
1987: Kenith Trodd
1988: John Willis

RTS Gold Medal
1975: Lord Aylestone
1976: Huw Wheldon
1977: Cyril Bennett (posthumous), Aubrey Buxton, Charles Curran, Bernard Sendall
1978: Geoffrey Cox
1979: The Open University
1980: Robin Scott
1981: John Freeman
1982: Hugh Greene
1983: Howard Steele
1984: William Brown
1985: Richard Taylor
1986: Production team of Survival1987: Denis Forman, Tony Pilgrim, Bill McMahon
1988: David Rose

Outstanding Achievement – In front of camera
1975: Ronnie Barker
1976: John Cleese
1977: Bernard Hepton
1978: Huw Wheldon
1979: Bryan Magee

Judges Award
1984: BBC Micro computer project team
1985: Shaun Sutton for the BBC Shakespeare plays
1986: Mersey Television for Brookside1987: Ken Westbury and Dennis Potter
1988: Betty Willingale

Children's Programme Award
1986: Look at Me (ITV)
1987: Odysseus (BBC)
1988: Bad Boyes'' (BBC)The Cyril Bennett Award1977: Lord Grade
1978: Huw Wheldon
1979: Shaun Sutton
1980: Denis Forman
1981: Granada TV – Drama Documentary Unit
1982: BBC Bristol – Natural History Unit
1983: Jeremy Isaacs
1984: Paul Fox
1985: David Nicholas
1986: James Hawthorne
1987: Alasdair Milne
1988: David PlowrightPopular Arts Award'''
1988: Cilla Black

References 

Award ceremonies
British television awards
Award ceremonies in the United Kingdom